Tularia is a genus of sea slugs, aeolid nudibranchs, marine gastropod mollusks in the family Flabellinidae.

Species
There is only one species within the genus Tularia:
 Tularia bractea (Burn, 1962)

Distribution
This species was described from Australia. It is known only from temperate waters in the south of Australia and New Zealand.

References 

Flabellinidae